Great Dunham is a village situated in the Breckland District of Norfolk and covers an area of 818 hectares (3.16 square miles) with an estimated population of 325, including Kempstone and increasing to a measured population of 344 at the 2011 Census.
 
The village's name means 'Hill homestead/village.'

It is served by St Andrew's church in the Benefice of Great Dunham.

Great Denham used to have a smock mill which was superseded by a tower mill, now derelict.

There was once a Dunham railway station serving the two sister settlements. It is now closed.

References

External link

Key to English Place-names

Villages in Norfolk
Breckland District
Civil parishes in Norfolk